Vitorino Francisco da Rocha e Silva (born on 19 April 1971), popularly known as Tino de Rans, is a Portuguese paver, television personality and politician.

Biography
Vitorino Silva was born in the small village of Rans in Penafiel; the sixth of eight siblings born to a ropemaker father and a smallholder and poultry farmer mother. His father died when he was eight years old.

He became President of the Parish Council of Rans in the 1993 local elections, where he was running for the Socialist Party; he was reelected in the 1997 elections and served until 2002. He became famous nationwide in February 1999, when he delivered an enthusiastic speech during the 11th National Congress of the Socialist Party that drew applause and laughter from the audience at the Coliseu dos Recreios; the speech ended with Silva hugging the party's secretary-general and incumbent Prime Minister António Guterres.

He enjoyed some fame as a media personality; in 2001 he released a music album (Tinomania, which included the popular hit "Pão Pão, Fiambre Fiambre"), and participated in SIC entertainment show Noites Marcianas and, in 2005, was a contestant in TVI reality show Quinta das Celebridades. Later still, in 2013, Silva was a contestant in the TVI celebrity reality show Big Brother VIP. In 2011, Silva, playing a fictionalised version of himself, participated in the acclaimed comedy show Último a Sair, spoofing Big Brother-like reality television shows.

Silva left the Socialist Party and unsuccessfully ran as an independent for Mayor of Valongo in the 2009 local elections, and for Mayor of Penafiel in the 2017 local elections.

In 2019, he founded React, Include, Recycle, a political party presenting itself as outside the conventional left–right political spectrum. The party was on the ballot for the first time in that year's legislative election, but failed to secure any seats in the Assembly of the Republic, with only 0.67% of the vote.

Silva was a candidate for President of the Republic in the 2016 presidential election and polled 6th place with 3.28% of the vote, a surprisingly good result for a candidate with no direct or indirect party support (very close to the results of Edgar Silva, the candidate supported by the Portuguese Communist Party, and of Maria de Belém Roseira, former President of the Socialist Party and twice government minister).

Vitorino Silva was a candidate for President of the Republic in the 2021 Portuguese presidential election. For the first time Vitorino was able to debate live on national television with the other candidates and was invited to debate in the final debate with every candidate. Silva gained notoriety for confronting the far-right candidate and Chega leader, André Ventura. The candidate offered André Ventura pebbles of all colours, claiming that “the sea brings pebbles of all colours, like the sea, Portugal has people of all colours” and if he was elected he would “be the president of the entire population”, unlike his rival.

References 

1971 births
20th-century Portuguese politicians
21st-century Portuguese politicians
Living people
People from Penafiel
Candidates for President of Portugal